Thomas Percy (fl. 1563) was an English politician.

Percy was a Member of the Parliament of England for Plympton Erle in 1563.

References

Year of birth missing
Year of death missing
English MPs 1563–1567
Members of the Parliament of England for Plympton Erle
1560s deaths